Robin "Robbie" Mustoe (born 28 August 1968) is an English retired footballer who now works as a commentator for NBC Sports. He made nearly 500 appearances in the Football League and Premier League, playing as a defensive midfielder for Oxford United, Middlesbrough, where he spent the majority of his career, Charlton Athletic and Sheffield Wednesday.

Mustoe was born in Witney, Oxfordshire.

Playing career
Mustoe began his football career as a junior with Oxford United. He made his Football League debut in the 1986–87 Football League First Division, and went on to play nearly 100 league games for the club.

He joined Middlesbrough in 1990 for £375,000. When Bryan Robson took over as player-manager in 1994, Mustoe initially lost his place. However, he worked his way back into the side, becoming a consistent member of the first team, featured in all three of the club's Wembley finals, and shared the club's 1999 Player of the Year award with Hamilton Ricard.

When Steve McClaren took over as manager in 2001, Mustoe was 33 and not part of McLaren's future plans. However, he again worked his way back into the team and played a prominent part in the 2001–02 season. He left the club in the summer of 2002, having made more than 450 appearances in all competitions.

He played a season at Charlton Athletic before ending his professional playing career in League One with Sheffield Wednesday. At Wednesday he scored once, an injury-time winner against Brighton & Hove Albion.

In his book Woody and Nord, Gareth Southgate describes Mustoe as "one of the most honest professionals in the game".

Coaching career
After retiring as a player, Mustoe moved to Lexington, Massachusetts, in the United States where he coached college soccer.

Media work
Mustoe moved to the USA after retiring from playing where he worked as a commentator/analyst for ESPN television for five years.  He was invited into ESPN by former Boro commentator Dave Roberts. where the two worked side by side in both the TV studio and conducting soccer commentaries. Mustoe also worked alongside Adrian Healey for ESPN's La Liga and UEFA Champions League coverage as well as working the 2010 FIFA World Cup in which he partnered with Healey and Derek Rae, and Euro 2012 where he worked with Healey. He also regularly appeared as a pundit on ESPN FC and made sporadic appearances for the network's Premier League coverage working in the studio.

In April 2013, he took a job for NBC as an analyst on their studio coverage of the English Premier League, as well as NBC's Match of the Day and Premier League Download programs.

Honours
Middlesbrough
Football League First Division: 1994–95
FA Cup runner-up: 1996–97
League Cup runner-up: 1996–97, 1997–98

References

External links
 
 

1968 births
Living people
People from Witney
English footballers
Association football midfielders
Oxford United F.C. players
Middlesbrough F.C. players
Charlton Athletic F.C. players
Sheffield Wednesday F.C. players
English Football League players
Premier League players
English emigrants to the United States
FA Cup Final players